The Baku Governorate, known before 1859 as the Shemakha Governorate, was a province (guberniya) of the Caucasus Viceroyalty of the Russian Empire, with its center in the booming metropolis and Caspian Sea port of Baku. Area (1897): 34,400 sq. versts, population (1897): 789,659. The Baku Governorate bordered Persia to the south, the Elizavetpol Governorate (the Tiflis and Erivan governorates before 1868) to the west, the Dagestan Oblast to the north, and the Baku gradonachalstvo to the east on the Absheron Peninsula.

History 
The governorate was originally established in 1846 as the Shemakha Governorate, replacing what had been several military precincts. Following the catastrophic 1859 Shamakhi earthquake, the capital of the governorate was transferred from Shamakha (Shаmakhi) to the fast-growing city of Baku, and on July 12, 1859, the governorate's name was changed accordingly. The coat of arms of the Baku Governorate was instituted on July 5, 1878. Initially, the Baku Governorate included the areas of the former khanates of Karabakh and Shaki until these areas were detached in 1868 to form part of the adjacent Elizavetpol Governorate.

The Armenians were dominant in the commerce of the Baku Governorate as evidenced by them controlling 29% of enterprises in the province as opposed to the Azerbaijanis owning only 18%. Whilst Armenians enjoyed more favourable treatment under the Russian administration and produced oil tycoons such as Alexander Mantashev, Azerbaijanis made up most of the unskilled low-paid labor jobs and were virtually absent from the administration of the province despite their preponderance. In the early 20th century, Russian official Grigory Golitsyn increased the number of Azerbaijanis in the administration and confiscated properties of the Armenian Apostolic Church, however, his anti-Armenian policies (which provoked the Armenian–Tatar clashes) were later repealed in 1905 under the rule of Illarion Vorontsov-Dashkov.

Upon the establishment of the Azerbaijan Democratic Republic, the Baku Governorate was incorporated into the fledgling state and subsequently separated into a smaller Baku General-Governorate and a Lenkoran General-Governorate, the latter being the location of the Provisional Military Dictatorship of Mughan which was suppressed in spring 1919. The governorate was eventually abolished in its entirety following the establishment of Soviet rule in Azerbaijan in 1920, however, its uezds ("counties") continued to exist until their administrative reorganization into raions ("districts") in 1929–1930.

Administrative divisions
The counties (uezds) of the Baku Governorate in 1917 were as follows:

Demographics
The ethnic group composition of the governorate changed considerably in the latter part of the 19th century. By the beginning of the 20th century, there were 214,700 inhabitants, amongst them, Russians, Ukrainians and Belarusians consisting of 76.3 thousand (35.5%), Tatars 46 thousand (21.4%), Armenians 42 thousand (19.4%), Persians 25 thousand (11.7%), Jews 9.7 thousand (4.5%), Georgians 4 thousand (1.9%), Germans 3.3 thousand (1.5%), and Kazan Tatars 2.3 thousand (1.1%). Muslims generally lived in the historical centre of Baku (Old Baku), surrounded by the khan's castle in the west of the city. Armenians mostly lived in the industrial zone in the north of the city. During the construction of the new city centre, various ethnic groups started to move to different districts.

Russian Empire Census 
The majority of the population indicated Tatar to be their mother tongue, with significant Tat, Russian, Armenian, Kyurin, and Talysh speaking minorities.

Kavkazskiy kalendar 

Governors
Konstantin Tarkhanov-Mouravov, 1859–1863
Mikhail Kolyubakin, 1863–1872
Dmitry Staroselsky, 1872–1875
Valery Pozen, 1875–1882
Justin von Huebsch Grostal, 1882–1888
Vladimir Rogge, 1888–1899
Dmitry Odintsov, 1899–1904
Mikhail Nakashidze, 1904–1905
Andrei Fadeyev, 1905
Vladimir Alyshevsky, 1905–1915
Leo Potulov, 1916–1917

Notes

References

Bibliography

External links
 

 
Caucasus Viceroyalty (1801–1917)
Governorates of the Caucasus
History of Baku
Modern history of Azerbaijan
19th century in Azerbaijan
1900s in Azerbaijan
1910s in Azerbaijan
States and territories established in 1859
States and territories disestablished in 1917
1859 establishments in the Russian Empire
1917 disestablishments in Russia
1859 establishments in Asia
1917 disestablishments in Asia